Pseudoamauroascus is a genus of fungi within the Onygenaceae family. This is a monotypic genus, containing the single species Pseudoamauroascus australiensis.

References

External links
 Pseudoamauroascus at Index Fungorum

Onygenales
Monotypic Eurotiomycetes genera